Roy G. Ratcliff (born 1947) is an American Christian minister and author. He is best known for ministering to serial killer Jeffrey Dahmer at the Columbia Correctional Institution in Portage, Wisconsin.

Personal life
Ratcliff grew up primarily in California. After graduating from high school in Wichita, Kansas, he graduated from Oklahoma Christian University in 1970. He and his wife Susan have two grown children. He currently resides in Cottage Grove, Wisconsin.

Ministering to Jeffrey Dahmer
Ratcliff first visited Dahmer in prison in April 1994 and baptized him as a Christian on May 10 in a whirlpool originally meant to treat injured prisoners. After this, Ratcliff visited Dahmer on a weekly basis, providing him with spiritual counseling and leading him in Bible study sessions. Six months later, Dahmer was murdered by a fellow prisoner Christopher Scarver.

Ratcliff conducted his funeral service on December 2, 1994, and eulogized him:

Ratcliff later wrote a book about his experiences titled Dark Journey, Deep Grace: Jeffrey Dahmer's Story of Faith (2006).

Since ministering to Dahmer, Ratcliff has discipled prisoners in a number of Wisconsin prisons.

Bibliography
Ratcliff, Roy; Adams, Lindy (2006). Dark Journey, Deep Grace: Jeffrey Dahmer's Story of Faith, Abilene, Texas: Leafwood Publishers. .

References

External links
 — features a review of Ratcliff's book about Jeffrey Dahmer

1948 births
Christian writers
Ministers of the Churches of Christ
American members of the Churches of Christ
Living people
Jeffrey Dahmer
People from Matador, Texas
Oklahoma Christian University alumni